Anders Gustaf von Düben (2 June 1785 – 4 October 1846) was a Swedish freiherr, painter, diarist and military officer. Von Düben is particularly known for being the last Swedish person sentenced to exile due to his involvement in the Düben-Vegesack-treason.

Biography 
Anders Gustaf was born son of the diplomat Henrik Jakob von Düben and Julie af Petersens. He was of French, Dutch, German and Scottish descent, descending from French huguenots residing in Saintogne on his grandmother Charlotta Bedoire's side. In addition, von Düben descends from several wealthy businessmen and academic personnel. von Düben himself had personal ties to the late royal house of Holstein-Gottorp that used to reign the Kingdom of Sweden.

Artistry 
Von Düben was a participating painter at the Royal Swedish Academy of Fine Arts' art exhibition in 1826.

The Düben-Vegesack-treason 

Von Düben was the last Swedish person sentenced to exile, along with Johan Fredrik Ernst von Vegesack, due to their ties to the late Hereditary Prince of Sweden. von Düben's ties to Gustav, Prince of Vasa was established during the Prince's infant years.

Timeline 
Von Vegesack, who at the time was stationed in Berlin, sent a letter to his friend von Düben, asking him to meet up with Gustav, Prince of Wasa, during a sejour to Vienna in the winter of 1832. The letter was intercepted, leading to von Düben and von Vegesack being accused of treacherous acts. Which consequently led to the arrest of barons von Veseack and von Düben on the Charge of High Treason.

He returned to Sweden in 1835.

Family 
In 1810, he married a woman native to Swedish Pomerania; Carolina Maria Eckhardt (1794–1861), she was a daughter of typographer Johann Heinrich Eckhardt.

Appointments 

   Recipient of the For Valour in the Field.

References 

1785 births
1846 deaths
Barons of Sweden
18th-century Swedish nobility
Gustavian era people
Swedish people of French descent
Swedish people of Scottish descent
Swedish people of Dutch descent
Swedish people of German descent
19th-century Swedish criminals
19th-century Swedish military personnel
19th-century Swedish painters
19th-century diarists
Military personnel from Stockholm
Swedish military officers
Swedish expatriates in Germany
Düben family